William of Saint Omer (died before 1204) was a Crusader noble. 

He was the second oldest son of Walter of Saint Omer and Eschiva of Bures. After the death of his father in 1174, Eschiva remarried to Raymond III, Count of Tripoli, who thus succeeded Walter as Prince of Galilee. In 1187, the Battle of Hattin signalled the end of the Principality of Galilee, which was occupied by Saladin, and Raymond of Tripoli was killed soon after; William's older brother Hugh II of Saint Omer became titular Prince of Galilee. He supported Guy of Lusignan over Conrad of Montferrat for the Kingdom of Jerusalem and joined Guy in besieging Acre in April 1189. At the time of Hugh's death in 1204, William had already died, and the title passed to their younger brother Raoul of Saint Omer and his line.

William was married to Marie, daughter of Renier, constable of Tripoli, widow of Baldwin of Ibelin. The couple had a daughter, Eschiva, who married Hugh Sans-Avoir, Lord of Le Puy.

Sources
Riley-Smith, Jonathan. The Feudal Nobility and the Kingdom of Jerusalem, 1174–1277. Archon Books, 1973.

Christians of the Crusades
Saint-Omer family
Year of death unknown
Nobility of the Kingdom of Jerusalem